Serena Williams's 2009 tennis season officially began at the 2009 Medibank International Sydney. Williams finished the year ranked world no. 1 for the second time in her career, having played in 16 tournaments, more than any other year. She also broke the record previously set by Justine Henin for the most prize money earned by a female tennis player in one year, with Williams earning $6,545,586. In doubles, she finished the year ranked world no. 3, despite playing only six tournaments as a pair. She won five Grand Slam titles, putting her total Grand Slam titles at 23.

Williams was named Female Athlete of the Year by the Associated Press in a landslide vote (66 of 158 votes – no other candidate received more than 18 votes). She also was the International Tennis Federation World Champion in singles and doubles.

Year in detail

Early hard court season and Australian Open

Medibank International Sydney
Williams began her 2009 season at the Medibank International Sydney as the top seed and faced local Samantha Stosur in the first round. Williams broke Stosur in the fourth game and maintained the advantage to close out the set. The second set went to a tie-break with a couple of breaks, the breaker went to Stosur. Stosur served for the match at the 10th game and had three match points, but Williams broke back and held. Williams then broke Stosur again in the twelfth game to take the match. In the second round Williams' cruised pass Sara Errani, losing just 3 games. In the quarterfinals Williams' had another tough match this time against Caroline Wozniacki, Williams lost the first set in a tie-break. The second set went to Williams when she broke in the ninth game after failing to serve the set out in the previous game. In the final set, Wozniacki took the lead and serve for the match at the twelfth game and had three match points but Williams broke and forced a tie-break, which she won to three. In the semifinals, Williams was routined by Dementieva in straight sets.

Australian Open
 
Williams came into the Australian Open having a chance to claim the world number 1 ranking. In her opening round she face Yuan Meng of China and won the first set with a single break and took the first 4 games of the second set and held the lead to win the match. In the following round she faced Gisela Dulko, where she won the first set easily. However, in the second set Dulko served for the set in the ninth game and had six set points, but Williams saved them all and broke and took the next 3 games to win in straight sets. In the third round she faced China's Peng Shuai and took the first set winning the last 6 games of the set. The second set was closer, with Williams being broke twice but still won the set in the tenth game. In the Round of 16, Williams got a lucky break, when her opponent Victoria Azarenka retires due to the heat, after Azarenka won the first set, and Williams was up by a break in the second. In the quarterfinals, Williams faced 8th seed Svetlana Kuznetsova and was in trouble when she fell by a set and Kuznetsova serving for the match at 5–4, However Williams took 9 of the last 10 games to win the match and be the only non-Russian in the semifinals. She avenged her loss to Elena Dementieva in their previous match as she defeated the Russian in straight sets with a break lead in each set.
 In the final, she faced world no. 3 Dinara Safina, wherein the winner will claim the world no. 1. In the first set Williams took in a bagel, hitting 12 winner and 2 unforced errors. In the second set Safina, had more resistance as she took 3 games in the set, but Williams was proven to good as she won her 10th slam title. The win also meant that Williams has now become the highest paid female athlete in history, overtaking golfer Annika Sörenstam.

In doubles, she paired with sister Venus and won their first three matches in straight sets against Svetlana Kuznetsova and Nadia Petrova, Ayumi Morita and Martina Müller, and Samantha Stosur and Rennae Stubbs.
 In the quarterfinals, they dropped their first set of the tournament against the team of Hsieh Su-wei and Peng Shuai, when they lost the second set, but eventually won in three. In the semifinals, they faced the team of Casey Dellacqua and Francesca Schiavone and won easily with a loss of only two games. In the final, they faced Daniela Hantuchová and Ai Sugiyama also known as "Hantuyama", the Williams sister fell by an early break but took six of the last seven games to the take the first set. They then took the second set, breaking in the ninth game of the second set to win the match.

Open GDF Suez

Having just re-claimed the no. 1 ranking, Williams competed in the Open GDF Suez. She cruised through in her first round against Iveta Benešová, Williams took the last 6 games of the first set to win it and then went on to take the second set as well.
 In the following round, she cruised pass Croat Karolina Šprem without dropping a point on serve in straight sets. In the quarterfinals, it was again smooth sailing for Williams as she dispatches Frenchwoman Émilie Loit in straight sets. Williams was then forced to withdraw from her semifinal match against Elena Dementieva due to a right knee tendon injury.

Dubai Tennis Championships
Williams next scheduled event is the Dubai Tennis Championships. Being the top seed, Williams received a bye into the second round, where she faced Italian Sara Errani, Williams dropped the first set, but came back dropping just two games in the nest two sets and winning a bagel in the third. She then faced 13th seed Zheng Jie, where she won in straight sets. In the quarterfinals, Williams faced former World no. 1 and reigning French Open champion Ana Ivanovic and won in four in straight sets, coming from a break down in the second set. In the semifinals, Williams faced sister Venus Williams in their 19th meeting having split their previous 18. The first set went to Venus, after Serena's first service percentage was a dire 36%, compared to her elder sibling's 83%, and she delivered six double faults, whereas Venus kept her slate clean. In the second set Serena cleaned her game, came back and won it to push a decider. The third set then went to a tie-break, which Venus won, thus ending Serena's 13 match winning-streak.

Sony Ericsson Open
Williams entered the Sony Ericsson Open as the top seed and received a bye into the second round. Williams began her campaign for a record sixth title against American wild card Alexa Glatch and won in straight sets. In the following round, she faced Peng Shuai and won in straight sets, however despite the straight sets win, Williams was broken three times. In the fourth round she faced Zheng Jie, Williams won the first five games, however Zheng won the next five games to even it out. Williams eventually broke in the twelfth game to win the set. In the second set Zheng was ahead by a break twice but failed to capitalize, however she broke Williams in the eleventh game and held to go to a decider. Zheng led by a break in the decider, but Williams was able to get back winning six of the last seven games to advance. In the quarterfinals, Williams faced her third Chinese opponent in a row in Li Na, Williams suffered a slow start losing the first five games, but was able to find some form to win the next four. However, Li was able to hold serve in the tenth game to win the set. The second set went to a tie-break after both players failed to take advantage of break points, Williams won the breaker losing only a point. Williams then broke Li in the third and fifth games and served it out in the eight game to advance to the semifinals In the semifinals, she faced sister Venus Williams, Serena served for the first set at ninth game, but was broken just to break again to take the set. In the second set Venus broke in the ninth game to push it to a decider. In the third set while serving to stay in the match at 5–3, Serena broke Venus to advance to her 7th Miami final. In the final, Williams faced Victoria Azarenka and lost convincingly 3–6, 1–6. Williams was hampered with ankle and quad injuries and was advised not to play in the final.

Clay court season and French Open

Andalucia Tennis Experience, Internazionali BNL d'Italia, Mutua Madrileña Madrid Open
Williams then headed to the clay court season. Her first tournament was at the Andalucia Tennis Experience, however she was upset by then world no. 95 Klára Zakopalová in three sets, with Williams winning the second. She then headed to the Internazionali BNL d'Italia having dropped the number 1 ranking to Safina, she faced Patty Schnyder in the second round after receiving a bye and lost in three sets, after winning the second set. Her clay court season has gone from bad to worse when she retired against Francesca Schiavone after having dropped the first set in the first round of the Mutua Madrileña Madrid Open due to a right knee injury. This is extended her losing streak to four, the longest in her career.

French Open

Williams entered the French Open having not won a match on clay. In the first round she faced Klára Zakopalová, who beat her in their last encounter. Williams was quick to take the lead was a set and a break-up; Williams squandered 5 match points in the ninth game and lost the second set in a tie-break. Williams then led the third with a break and had three match points in the eight game and had another three match points, but Zakopalová came back to get it on serve, just to lose her serve in the tenth game of the third set to hand the win to Williams in Williams' ninth match point. This ends Williams' four match losing streak. In the second round, Williams faced Virginia Ruano Pascual and unlike her first-round match, Williams cruised through, losing just two games including a bagel in the first set. In her next match she faced another Spaniard in María José Martínez Sánchez. Martínez Sánchez took the first set with a break, but with controversy as Williams fired in a powerful shot that appeared to graze Martínez Sánchez's hand as she looked to defend herself. The Spaniard denied that such happened, Martínez Sánchez got the break in that game and took the set. Williams came back and took the last two sets with a single break lead in each set. In the fourth round, she face Canadian Aleksandra Wozniak and won comfortably in straight sets in 53 minutes. In the quarterfinals, she faced Russian Svetlana Kuznetsova, Kuznetsova took the first set in a tie-break after saving a set point on her own serve in the twelfth game. Kuznetsova served for the match in the ninth game of the second set, but Williams broke through and won the last four games to push it to a decider. Williams then led by an early break just to surrender it and the match to Kuznetsova when she got broken in the twelfth game of the third set. Williams later admitted that she got tight in the match.

In the doubles, Williams paired again with sister Venus and entered as the fifth seeds; the sisters scrapped through their first two matches, winning it in three against the teams of Andrea Hlaváčková and Lucie Hradecká, and  Gisela Dulko and Ágnes Szávay. However, their resistance was placed in halt as they lost in the third round to Bethanie Mattek-Sands and Nadia Petrova; after winning the first set, they eventually lost in a tie-break in the final set.

Wimbledon Championships
Williams entered Wimbledon Championships as the second seed and favorite.
 In her opening match, she faced Neuza Silva and won in straight sets without facing a break point. She hit nine aces and 32 winners in the win. In the second round, she faced Australian Jarmila Groth and won the first set by breaking Groth in the fourth and eight game. In the second set, Groth didn't held serve but broke Williams once in the set, handing Williams the match. The match lasted only 57 minutes. In the third round, she faced Italy's Roberta Vinci and won in straight sets, despite getting broken twice in the match, once in each set. In the round of 16, she faced Daniela Hantuchová and won easily in straight sets. In the quarterfinals, Williams faced Victoria Azarenka, the woman that defeated her in the final of Miami, Williams won the last four games of the first set to win it. Azarenka then led by a break in the second set, but Williams came back once again winning the last four games to advance. In the semifinals, Williams faced rival Elena Dementieva. The first set saw Dementieva breaking the Williams serve just to be broken back. The set was pushed to a tie-break, which was won by Dementieva. Williams then broke in opening game of the second just to be broken in the sixth game. Williams then broke the Russian in the 11th game and served out the set to force a third set. In the final set, Dementieva broke early in the deciding set for a 3–1 lead only for Williams to break back immediately.Dementieva had a break and match point in the tenth games only for Williams to retrieve it with a low volley that clipped the net. The match remained close until Williams secured a break in the 13th game and serve it out and head to the final. In the final, she faced sister Venus Williams in their fourth Wimbledon final. Serena took the first set in a tie-break, the first saw Venus having break points but failing to convert whereas Serena didn't have any. Serena broke Venus twice in the second set including in the final game and won in her fourth match point to win her 11th slam and third Wimbledon.

Once again, Williams paired with her sister Venus Williams in doubles as the fourth seeds. In the first round, they faced the French team of Virginie Razzano and Aravane Rezaï and won in three in both sets. They then cruised pass Sabine Lisicki and Aleksandra Wozniak in the second round in straight sets. In the third round, they faced the Chinese pair of Yan Zi and Zheng Jie and dominated winning in a double bagel. In the final eight, they defeated Anna-Lena Grönefeld and Vania King in straight sets.
 In the semifinals, they faced the top seeds and co-world no. 1's Cara Black and Liezel Huber and won losing only three games. In the final they took on the Australian duo of Samantha Stosur and Rennae Stubbs and won in two close sets, winning the first in a breaker and the second with a single break lead to claim their ninth slam as a team.

US Open Series

Bank of the West Classic
 
Williams began her US Open preparation at the Bank of the West Classic. Williams faced Li Na in the first round, she had a set and had two match points in the eight game, however Li came back to force it to a tie-break. Williams closed out the match in her seventh match point. In the second round she faced Hungarian Melinda Czink, Williams broke in the fourth game and held it to take the set. Czink led by an early break, but Williams was able to force it to a tie-break, where she saved a set point and won the set to advance. In the quarterfinals, Williams took on Samantha Stosur, Stosur won the first set, but Williams came back winning the second. Williams had break points in the fifth game but failed to convert, that proved costly as Stosur took the next three games to take the final set and the match.

The Williams Sisters paired up to play doubles. They cruised through their first three matches in straight sets to advance to the finals, defeating the teams of Chen Yi and Mashona Washington, Līga Dekmeijere and Julie Ditty, and Bethanie Mattek-Sands and Nadia Petrova. They claimed their third title of the year by defeating the team of Yung-Jan Chan and Monica Niculescu in the final.

Western & Southern Financial Group Women's Open
Williams next scheduled event is the Western & Southern Financial Group Women's Open. Williams received a bye in the first round and defeated Kateryna Bondarenko in the second round in straight sets. In the following round she faced Sybille Bammer, this time ending up in the losing side in straight sets. Williams also lost her only previous encounter with Bammer.

Rogers Cup
Williams made her final stop before the US Open at the Rogers Cup. Williams got a bye to advance to the second round where she faced Yaroslava Shvedova and easily won in straight set only dropping 5 games. In the next round, Williams faced Alona Bondarenko and once again won with only dropping 5 games. In the quarterfinals, for the third match in a row, Williams only dropped five games this time to Czech Lucie Šafářová. In the semifinals, she faced Elena Dementieva for the fourth time in the year. Williams served for the match in the ninth game but Dementieva rallied to push the first set into a tie-break, which Dementieva won. Dementieva then took advantage taking the second set dropping only a game to advance to the final.

US Open
Williams began her quest for her twelfth slam at the US Open, she entered the tournament as the defending champion and is trying to win US Open for two consecutive years for the first time. She opened her campaign against compatriot Alexa Glatch, Williams won easily in straight sets despite making 18 winners to 19 unforced errors in the match. In the following round, she faced Melinda Czink, and won with a double breadstick victory. Williams made 25 winners to just 9 unforced errors. In the third round she faced María José Martínez Sánchez for the first time after their controversial match in the French, Williams broke in the second game and held it through to take the first set. In the second set Williams went behind by an early break but came back to serve it out in the twelfth game. In the next round, she stormed pass Daniela Hantuchová, as Williams reeled in 10 games in a row starting from the fifth game of the first set to move on. In the final eight, Williams faced Italian Flavia Pennetta and won in straight sets, hitting 22 winners to 19 unforced errors. After several rain delays, her semifinal match against Kim Clijsters took place 4 days after her quarterfinal match. Williams was down by a set and 5-6 15–30, serving to stay in the match when a foot fault was called that gave Clijsters two match points. Williams then launched into a tirade directed at the lineswoman, for which Serena was given a code violation. The violation ended up as a point penalty due to receiving a warning for racquet abuse earlier in the match, thus ending the match in controversial fashion. The following day, Williams was issued the maximum permissible on-site fine of $10,000 (plus $500 for racquet abuse). After further investigation, the Grand Slam Committee in November 2009 fined her $175,000 in lieu of suspending her from the 2010 US Open or other Grand Slam events. They also placed her on a two-year probation, so if Williams committed another offense in the following two years at a Grand Slam tournament, she would be suspended from participating in the following US Open. If she committed no offenses in the next two years, her fine would be reduced to $82,500. Williams initially refused to apologize for her outburst, both in her post-match press conference and in an official statement released the following day. She eventually apologized to the lineswoman in a statement two days following the incident.

Vying for their first title as a team at the US Open in ten years, the Williams sisters made quick work of their first three opponents Julia Görges and Arantxa Parra Santonja, Yung-Jan Chan and Katarina Srebotnik, and Sorana Cîrstea and Caroline Wozniacki defeating them all in straight sets. In the quarterfinals they defeated Yan Zi and Zheng Jie defeating them in two tight sets. In the semifinals, they faced the Russian pairing of Alisa Kleybanova and Ekaterina Makarova and won the first set in tie-break. However, they lost the second set ending their 29-set winning streak. The final set went to the Williams sisters as they advance to the final. In the final, they faced top ranked doubles team of Cara Black and Liezel Huber and took control of the match to claim their tenth slam as a team and their second US Open crown.

Asian Swing and Year-End Championships

China Open
Williams then went to Asia at the China Open with a chance of regaining the world no. 1 ranking from Dinara Safina. In the first round she faced Estonian Kaia Kanepi and won in straights with a single break lead in each set. Williams then defeated Ekaterina Makarova in the second round in two easy sets and claimed the no. 1 ranking after Safina fell earlier in the day. In the round of 16, she took on Russian Nadia Petrova, Petrova took the first set, with Williams coming back to take the second. In the third set both displayed good serving as neither dropped serve to push it to a tie-break, which Petrova won.

WTA Tour Championships
Williams entered the Year-End Championships as the second seed and was placed in the Maroon group with Elena Dementieva, Svetlana Kuznetsova and sister Venus Williams. Williams was in contention for the Year-End no. 1 ranking along with top seed Dinara Safina. Williams began her tournament against Svetlana Kuznetsova. Williams rallied in the first coming back from a break twice to take it to a tie-break, Williams then took the second set breaking Kuznetsova in the 11th game of the set and served it out to win the match. In her second round robin match, Williams faced older sister Venus Williams. Serena lost the first set but came back to win the second. In the finals set Serena was up by a double break, just to see Venus take five games in a row. Serena was serving to stay in that match in twelfth game and saved a match point to go to a tie-break, with Serena taking the breaker. Due to Safina's withdrawal from the event, thus securing Serena Williams the Year End no. 1 ranking only for the second time in her career. In her final group match, she took on Elena Dementieva, whom she has split their 4 meeting in the year,  Dementieva began the match by breaking Williams in the third game, just to see Williams get back by winning the next seven game to take the first set and an early break. Dementieva came back to push it on serve but got broken in the ninth game of the set and Williams closed it out to go 3–0 in her group. In the semifinals, Williams faced Caroline Wozniacki, where she took the first set and was broken in the first game when Wozniacki retired due to a left abdominal strain. In the final it was an all-Williams final, as she took on sister Venus Williams, Serena took the first set breaking Venus twice. The second set, went on serve all throughout, with no breaks thus going to a tie-break, which Serena won to cap her no. 1 ranking with her 35th title.

Williams qualified with sister Venus Williams and played for the first time as team in the Year-End Championships. In the semifinals they faced the Spanish duo of Nuria Llagostera Vives and María José Martínez Sánchez, where they took the first set but lost the second set. In the match tie-break, the Williams sisters lost it by 10 points to 8.

All matches

Singles matches

Doubles matches

Tournament schedule

Singles schedule
Williams' 2009 singles tournament schedule is as follows:

Doubles schedule

Williams' 2009 doubles tournament schedule is as follows:

Yearly records

Head-to-head matchups
Ordered by percentage of wins

 Melinda Czink 2-0
 Sara Errani 2-0
 Alexa Glatch 2-0
 Daniela Hantuchová 2-0
 Li Na 2-0
 María José Martínez Sánchez 2-0
 Peng Shuai 2-0
 Caroline Wozniacki 2-0
 Zheng Jie 2-0
 Dinara Safina 1-0
 Iveta Benešová 1-0
 Karolina Šprem 1-0
 Émilie Loit 1-0
 Ana Ivanovic 1-0
 Yuan Meng 1-0
 Gisela Dulko 1-0
 Virginia Ruano Pascual 1-0
 Aleksandra Wozniak 1-0
 Neuza Silva 1-0
 Jarmila Groth 1-0
 Roberta Vinci 1-0
 Kateryna Bondarenko 1-0
 Yaroslava Shvedova 1-0
 Alona Bondarenko 1-0
 Lucie Šafářová 1-0
 Flavia Pennetta 1-0
 Kaia Kanepi 1-0
 Ekaterina Makarova 1-0
 Venus Williams 4-1
 Victoria Azarenka 2-1
 Svetlana Kuznetsova 2-1
 Elena Dementieva 3-2
 Samantha Stosur 1-1
 Klára Zakopalová 1-1
 Patty Schnyder 0-1
 Francesca Schiavone 0-1
 Sybille Bammer 0-1
 Kim Clijsters 0-1
 Nadia Petrova 0-1

Finals

Singles: 4 (3–1)

Doubles: 4 (4–0)

Earnings

 Figures in United States dollars (USD) unless noted.

See also
Venus Williams
2009 WTA Tour

References

External links

2009
Williams
Williams,Serena